Teufenbachweiher is a reservoir in the municipality of Schönenberg, Canton of Zurich, Switzerland.

External links
Swissdams: Teufenbachweiher

Lakes of the canton of Zürich
Reservoirs in Switzerland
LTeufenbachweiher